Patrik Aspers (born 1970) is a Swedish sociologist, who is chair of Sociology at the Unviversity of St. Gallen, Switzerland. He has worked in several countries. His research has mostly been on sociological theory and economic sociology, often drawing on phenomenology. Markets are the central topic of his research, and empirically he has mainly studied the fashion industry. He has developed notions like "aesthetic markets", "status markets" and "standard markets".

Background
Aspers earned a PhD at Stockholm University (2001). He studied under the supervision of Richard Swedberg. Harrison White is also among the teachers he had as a PhD student. He has previously been employed or guest at; for example, Harvard University, Columbia University, the London School of Economics, College de France, and Max Planck Institute for the Study of Societies. Aspers was President of the Swedish Sociological Association (2010–2012).

Selected publications

References

1970 births
Living people
Stockholm University alumni
Academic staff of Stockholm University
Swedish sociologists